The following elections occurred in the year 1853.

 1853 Dutch general election
 1853 Liberian general election
 1853 New Zealand general election

North America

United States
 1853 New York state election
 1853 Texas gubernatorial election

South America

Argentina 
 1853 Argentine presidential election

See also
 :Category:1853 elections

1853
Elections